Air Satellite was an airline based in Baie-Comeau, Quebec, Canada. It operated scheduled, charter passenger and cargo services, as well as supplying aviation fuel, ground services and aircraft maintenance and repair. Its main base was Baie-Comeau Airport, with hubs at Rimouski Airport, Sept-Îles Airport, Havre Saint-Pierre Airport and Quebec Airport.

History 
The airline was established in 1968 and started operations in May 1968. It was founded by Jean Fournier and Real Poulin as a flying school. The acquisition of other related companies led to the launch into passenger and cargo transport services.

Air Satellite sustained a fatal accident on December 7, 1998, when its aircraft, a Britten-Norman BN2A Islander, fell into the St. Lawrence River one mile from the Baie-Comeau Airport, killing 7 and injuring 3 more.  The crash was one cause for the airline's diminished success, which eventually led to its sale in 2007 to Exact Air.

Fleet 
The Air Satellite fleet consisted of the following aircraft in August 2007:

2 Raytheon Beech King Air 100
3 Cessna 402
1 Cessna 310

See also 
 List of defunct airlines of Canada

References

External links

Air Satellite

Defunct airlines of Canada
Baie-Comeau
Companies based in Quebec
Airlines established in 1968
Airlines disestablished in 2008
1968 establishments in Quebec
2008 disestablishments in Quebec